Mound City station, also known as the Mound City Museum, is a historic train station located at Mound City, Holt County, Missouri.  It was built in 1921 by the Chicago, Burlington and Quincy Railroad, and is a simple one-story, hollow tile and red brick building measuring 100 feet by 25 feet.  It sits on a concrete foundation and has a gable roof.  It houses a local history museum.

It was listed on the National Register of Historic Places in 1978 as the Chicago, Burlington and Quincy Depot.

References

External links
Mound City Museum website

History museums in Missouri
Former Chicago, Burlington and Quincy Railroad stations
Railway stations on the National Register of Historic Places in Missouri
Railway stations in the United States opened in 1921
National Register of Historic Places in Holt County, Missouri
Former railway stations in Missouri